Al Ashah District  is a district of the 'Amran Governorate, Yemen. As of 2003, the district had a population of 43,859 inhabitants.

References

Districts of 'Amran Governorate
Al Ashah District